Elections for the members of the House of Representatives were held on June 5, 1934 pursuant to the Philippine Organic Act of 1902, which prescribed elections for every three years. The ruling Nacionalista Consolidado was split anew into two factions: the Democrata Pro-Independencias who were in favor of the Hare–Hawes–Cutting Act (the "Pros"), and the Democraticos who were against it (the "Antis"). The "Antis" were led by then-Senate President Manuel L. Quezon while the "Pros" were led by then-Senator Sergio Osmeña. The "Antis" won in the House while the "Pros" won in the Senate.

Results

Note

A.  The combined number of seats of the Nacionalista Party before it was divided into two factions.

References

  

1934
History of the Philippines (1898–1946)
1934 elections in Asia
1934 in the Philippines